Perdida is a 2019 Mexican drama film directed by Jorge Michel Grau. The film is an adaptation of the 2011 Colombian film La cara oculta directed by Andrés Baiz, and it was presented at the seventeenth edition of the Morelia International Film Festival as part of the National Authors and Releases section. It stars Paulina Dávila, and José María de Tavira.

Synopsis 
Taken from the Spanish film website FilmAffinity:

Cast 
 Paulina Dávila as Carolina
 José María de Tavira as Eric
 Juan Carlos Colombo as Benitez
 Luis Fernando Peña as Vilches
 Cristina Rodlo as Fabiana
 Claudette Maillé as Blanca
 Paulette Hernández as Julia
 Sonia Franco as Ligia

Release 
It had its premiere in Mexico on January 10, 2020. Not before, it was also screened in the Morelia International Film Festival and Los Cabos International Film Festival in 2019.

Reception 
Perdida was very well received by critics and the majority of the audience, as it holds 92% approval in the Spanish version of the review aggregator Rotten Tomatoes, based on 5 reviews, all of which are positive, saying in its critical consensus that, "It stands out for its manufacturing and effective directing and it works thanks to the dynamism of cameras and the well-structured script. The actors without surprise manage to be convincing and create the appropriate suspense".

References

External links 
 

Mexican drama films

Remakes of Spanish films
Film remakes
2010s Mexican films